Titanic: Blood and Steel is a 12-part television costume drama series about the construction of the RMS Titanic. Produced by History Asia, it is one of two large budget television dramas aired in April 2012, the centenary of the disaster; the other is Titanic.

Titanic: Blood and Steel premiered in Germany and Denmark on April 15, 2012, in Italy on April 22, 2012, and in France in December 2012. Part of the filming took place in Serbia, where the series aired beginning September 9, 2012. In Canada, it began to air on September 19, 2012, on CBC. It was aired in the United States as a six-part mini-series with two episodes back-to-back from October 8, 2012, until October 13, 2012, on Encore.

Cast
 Kevin Zegers as Mark Muir/Marcus Malone
 Alessandra Mastronardi as Sofia Silvestri
 Derek Jacobi as William Pirrie, 1st Viscount Pirrie
 Neve Campbell as Joanna Yaegar
 Ophelia Lovibond as Kitty Carlton / Burlington 
 Bill Carter as Thomas Andrews
 Branwell Donaghey as Michael McCann
 Martin McCann as Conor McCann
 Ian McElhinney as Sir Henry Carlton
 Valentina Corti as Violetta Silvestri
 Denise Gough as Emily Hill
 Jonathan Harden as Walter Hill
 Edoardo Leo as Andrea Valle
 Gray O'Brien as J. Bruce Ismay
 Michael McElhatton as Albert Hatton
 Liam Cunningham as James Larkin
 Chris Noth as J. P. Morgan
 Massimo Ghini as Pietro Silvestri
 Paul Herwig  as Florian von Altenberg
 Liam Carney as Sean Malone
 Bill Murphy as Bremner

Summary
The series follows the lives of the people who made the Titanic, from the workers who built it to its rich financiers. Dr. Mark Muir, an engineer and metallurgist, convinces American tycoon J. P. Morgan to hire him for the biggest shipping project in the world, the construction of the RMS Titanic at Belfast's Harland and Wolff shipyard. Mark is, in truth, a Belfast native born Marcus Malone. Now, with a new name and identity, he tries to hide his heritage from his employers, as he is Catholic and his employers, the Protestant elite that rule Belfast, dislike Catholics.

While working there, Mark falls in love with Sofia Silvestri, an Italian immigrant. However, during the construction of the Titanic, tensions rise between the lower-class workers and the rich elite. More setbacks stall the construction: Harland and Wolff want to save costs and use cheaper materials, the workers wish to form a trade union, the women suffrage movement heats up in the UK, and the pro Home Rule and pro-Unionist groups battle each other. Mark attempts to deal with these while trying to escape his past.

Deviations from historical fact
Below is a selection of some deviations from historical fact:

 The riots and labour unrest in the series are portrayed as safety and wage related; however, they were caused by Harland and Wolff's hiring practices. Harland and Wolff practiced sectarian discrimination and hired predominantly Protestant workers. Catholics rioted against this and the Royal Irish Constabulary were called in. For the period, Harland and Wolff's wages were considered fair, as were the death and injury benefits paid to workers, or to their families, who suffered mishap in their yard. That said, in the plot the sectarian tensions are shown to be a driving force among the various socioeconomic levels and how they relate to each other; including in the fifth episode Lord Pirrie regretfully acknowledging to Dr. Muir that he could have never been employed at White Star at his level if it was known that he was a Catholic, even with a letter of recommendation from J. P. Morgan himself. 
 It is also insinuated that Harland and Wolff favored cheaper steel of lower quality to save money, with the implication that cheaper steel played a part in the sinking and loss of life.  It has been thoroughly documented, however, that the ship's steel plates were of good quality for the period. Indeed, the RMS Olympic showed great inherent strength prior to the Titanic disaster, and remained in service on the Atlantic until the mid-1930s; Titanics hull strength is demonstrated by the fact that, even after her bow section plunged  miles to the sea floor, it still remains largely intact. Although her hull broke apart in the final few minutes of the sinking, this was because the strains imposed upon it were simply greater than any ocean liner was designed to bear, and not a symptom of structural weakness.
 American Financier J. P. Morgan is portrayed as overseeing construction of the Titanic, heavily involved in decisions regarding the liner's construction. Although Morgan had acquired the White Star Line in 1902, and had rolled it into his shipping combine, the International Mercantile Marine (or IMM), the White Star Line was run by its Managing Director, J. Bruce Ismay. Ismay, in turn, became President of the IMM in 1904. It was in fact White Star, not Morgan and IMM, which financed the construction of Olympic, Titanic and Britannic. However the series does correctly show that it was Ismay, not Morgan, who was involved in decisions regarding the ships' design, interior appointments, safety features, etc. His domineering character which is the traditional depiction of his reputation is intact.
 The timeline of events during Titanic's construction and fitting out is significantly distorted in this miniseries. Olympic and Titanic were built side by side on Harland & Wolff Slips Nos. 2 & 3, with Olympic enjoying a lead of several months' progress over her sister. Olympic was launched on October 20, 1910; Titanic was launched on May 31, 1911. On that date, Olympic had just finished her trials, and she began her maiden voyage in June. Olympic's collision with HMS Hawke was September 20, 1911 - well into the time of Titanic's fitting-out. However, in the series, the Olympic had entered service close to the time that Titanic'''s keel was laid, the collision with the Hawke happened long before Titanic was launched, a significant inaccuracy.
 Titanic did not embark passengers in Belfast. Titanic departed Belfast on April 2, arrived in Southampton 28 hours later, and did not depart Southampton until April 10.  With just one exception, the only non-crew members embarked at Belfast were members of the H&W guarantee group and a Board of Trade official.  
 In the show, Ismay says that Titanic was 'significantly larger' than the Olympic; in reality, the two ships were of similar size.
 In the series, the term "unsinkable" (or "theoretically unsinkable") is thought of and applied primarily to Titanic by the fictional character Muir after the collision with HMS Hawke, when in reality it was introduced by White Star publicity and period Trade journals such as The Shipbuilder during construction of the two liners, and was applied to both equally. (Coincidentally, the special number of The Shipbuilder in which the term appeared is seen in the series long before Muir supposedly thought of it).
 While the damage to the Olympic by the collision with the Hawke was on her aft-starboard quarter, the damage is shown on her forward-port quarter.
 The worries portrayed among Lord Pirrie, Thomas Andrews and Dr. Muir about the Titanic being just "too big" are a great exaggeration. Although Olympic and Titanic were the two largest ships in the world, at the time, the Hamburg-Amerika Line was beginning work on a trio of even larger superliners, and the Cunard Line was planning to build a similarly-sized liner that would be the larger, slower sister to Mauretania and Lusitania.

Episode list
{| class="wikitable plainrowheaders" style="width:100%; margin:auto;"
|-style="color:white"
! style="background: #000099; text-align:center;"|#
! style="background: #000099; text-align:center;"|Title
! style="background: #000099; text-align:center;"|Written by
! style="background: #000099; text-align:center;"|Original airdate on History Channel Asia

{{Episode list
| EpisodeNumber= 12
| Title= The ‘Unsinkable’ Sets Sail
| WrittenBy=
| OriginalAirDate=
| ShortSummary= April 2, 1912. The time has come for the great ship to leave for the New World. In New York City, as Morgan always wanted, the Titanics maiden voyage will become one of the first great PR events for his firm as he decides to promote a gala to celebrate the ship's first voyage upon arrival. Back in Belfast, Sofia and Joanna Yaeger become friends, and she gets Sofia a job as an illustrator for The New York Times. Pietro uses most of his money to buy Sofia a ticket for the Titanic. Mark himself only gets on board by chance when Thomas Andrews asks him to be a part of the ship's guarantee group. The group also includes Jack Lowry, a young riveter we met at the beginning of the story. Violetta goes with the baby, whom Michael McCann has come back to marry and they board together. Emily decides not to go to America, but to remain in Belfast to continue her activist work. Sean also decides against traveling to America because he considers Belfast his only world and he would not feel at home anywhere else. Thomas Andrews will come on board as well as White Star Chairman Bruce Ismay. Lord Pirrie, still recovering from his illness, decides not to partake in the voyage. Joanna will be on-board to take her stolen documents to New York to another German contact. Kitty will also be on board, who is now an acclaimed stage and screen actress. A little girl by the name of Sarah (Mark's daughter), with her adopted mother, board Third Class. Neither Mark nor his daughter are aware of each other's presence on board the Titanic. Andrea also happens to be on board, courtesy of his friend Giacomo; they are both working their way to America as two of the Titanic's stokers. And, while the ship sails for New York, Mark and Sofia finally find happiness and reconciliation as they meet on the ship. At the very conclusion, as Sean watches the Titanic sail away with his son on board, the audience is left asking: who amongst these characters will survive the impending great disaster?
 |LineColor= 000099
}}
|}

Nielsen Ratings
In the United States, Titanic: Blood and Steel'' aired on Encore, which does not publish Nielsen Ratings on a frequent basis.  Due to the lack of published reports, only ratings for certain episodes are available.

Home media release 
Lions Gate Entertainment has released the 12-part miniseries on DVD and Blu-ray Disc on December 4, 2012.

References

External links
 
 Official Titanic: Blood and Steel History Channel Asia website 

Television series about RMS Titanic
CBC Television original programming
Television series set in the 1900s
Television shows set in England
Television shows set in Belfast
Television shows filmed in Serbia